Ziya Pasha, the pseudonym of Abdul Hamid Ziyaeddin (1829, Constantinople – 17 May 1880, Adana), was an Ottoman writer, translator and administrator. He was one of the most important authors during the Tanzimat period of the Ottoman Empire, along with İbrahim Şinasi and Namık Kemal.

He held several offices in the state. From 1865, he was a leading member of the reformist secret society known as the Young Ottomans. In 1867, he went with Namık Kemal to Paris and London, where he published a newspaper called Hürriyet (Freedom).

His return to the Ottoman Empire was followed by tenures as governor of Cyprus, Amasya, Konya, Aleppo, and Adana, where he died in 1880.

Works 
 Terkîb-i Bend
 Zafername
 Şi'ir ve inşâ
 Hârâbat

References

1880 deaths
1820s births
Politicians of the Ottoman Empire
19th-century writers from the Ottoman Empire
19th-century translators
Ottoman governors of Aleppo
19th-century pseudonymous writers